Ewa Maria Demarczyk (16 January 1941 – 14 August 2020) was a Polish singer, generally associated with the sung poetry genre and the Piwnica pod Baranami cabaret.

Demarczyk was recognized as one of the most talented and charismatic singers in the history of Polish music. She was praised for her unique interpretations, expression, and unusual stage personality. In the 1960s, she drew comparisons with Édith Piaf. In Poland, she was often referred to as "the Dark Angel".

Biography
She started her career in 1961, when she joined Jagiellonian University Medical College's student cabaret Cyrulik. After a year she left Cyrulik for Piwnica pod Baranami, where she met Zygmunt Konieczny, with whom she would work for the next four years.

Her first big success was a performance at the 1963 National Festival of Polish Song in Opole, where she received an award for the songs "Karuzela z madonnami", "Taki pejzaż" and "Czarne anioły". Later the same year, she sang at the Sopot International Song Festival and was named the best artist of 1963 by Polish journalists. In 1964 she took second place in Sopot for "Grande Valse Brillante". She went on to perform at Olympia in Paris, at Bruno Coquatrix's invitation, as well as at a ceremony celebrating the 20th anniversary of United Nations.

In 1966, Demarczyk graduated from the Ludwik Solski Academy for the Dramatic Arts (however, she never had any film roles). The same year she teamed up with another composer, Andrzej Zarycki. 1967 saw the release of her first album, Ewa Demarczyk śpiewa piosenki Zygmunta Koniecznego, which proved to be a major success and was later certified platinum for selling over 100,000 copies.

At the turn of the 1960s and 1970s, she travelled extensively around the world to countries such as Italy, France, Germany, Cuba, Brazil, Mexico, United States, Australia, United Kingdom and Finland. She performed in numerous concert halls, including Carnegie Hall in New York and the Chicago Theatre.

Demarczyk left the Piwnica pod Baranami in 1972. Two years later her next album was issued, including some new Polish songs and four Russian-language versions of her previous hits. The album was released in Russia by the state-owned label Melodiya and sold several million copies. Later in the 1970s she was awarded an honorary award at Opole Festival and the Order of Polonia Restituta.

Her 1982 live album, simply titled Live, turned out to be a big success, achieving gold certification in Poland. In the mid-1980s Demarczyk founded her own theatre in Kraków. In spite of formal difficulties, it was soon shut down, although it generated interest. In the 1990s her albums were re-released on CD and Demarczyk received a number of awards recognising her input to Polish culture. She continued to perform live until the late 1990s.

She gave her last concert on  8 November 1999 at the Grand Theatre in Poznań and afterwards she completely withdrew from public life. In 2001 a foundation, Teatr Ewy Demarczyk, was created. She died on 14 August 2020, aged 79.

Style
Demarczyk's repertoire consisted of demanding, not easily accessible interpretations of poems. Since her songs are often based on works by "classical" poets – both Polish such as Julian Tuwim and Krzysztof Kamil Baczyński and international like Goethe, Mandelstam, Rainer Maria Rilke, as well as avant-garde writers such as Miron Białoszewski – the genre that Demarczyk is associated with is called sung poetry.

In her performances, she united both dramatic theatrical expression and vocal art (she was a graduate of both a drama school and conservatory, where she studied the piano). The songs she performed were essentially short, intense musical dramas.

Awards and honours
 1962: 2nd Prize at the National Students' Song Festival for the song Karuzela z madonnami
 1963: 1st Prize at the National Festival of Polish Song in Opole for the song Czarne anioły ("Black Angels")
 1963: Special Award at the Sopot International Song Festival for the song Czarne anioły
 1964: 2nd Prize at the Sopot International Song Festival for the song Grande Valse Brillante
 1967: Prize at the World Theatre Festival in Arezzo, Italy
 1969: 1st Prize at the Mondial du Theatre Festival in Nancy, France
 1971: Gold Cross of Merit
 1977: Officer of the National Order of the Legion of Honour, (France)
 1978: Prize of the Ministry of Foreign Affairs of Poland for "outstanding contributions to the promotion of Polish culture abroad"
 1978: City of Kraków Award
 1979: Special Journalists' Award at the XVII National Festival of Polish Song in Opole
 1979: Knight's Cross of the Order of Polonia Restituta
 1990: Special Award at the XXVII National Festival of Polish Song in Opole for "outstanding achievements in the art of song interpretation"
 1993: Special Award of the Polish Television
 1997: Prize of the Kraków Voivodeship for "great artistic achievements as well as contributions to shaping the musical image of Poland"
 2000: Commander's Cross of the Order of Polonia Restituta
 2005: Gold Medal for Merit to Culture - Gloria Artis
 2010: Gold Fryderyk Award for Lifetime Achievements
 2011: Special Award of the TVP1 Channel for "a distinguished figure in the Polish culture"
 2012: The Annual Award of the Ministry of Culture and National Heritage of the Republic of Poland for Lifetime Achievements
 2017: Commander's Cross with Star of the Order of Polonia Restituta

Discography

Albums:

 1967: Ewa Demarczyk śpiewa piosenki Zygmunta Koniecznego
 1974: Ewa Demarczyk
 1982: Live

Singles:

 1963:	Karuzela z madonnami / Czarne anioły / Taki pejzaż
 1964:	Grande Valse Brillante	
 1968:	Grande Valse Brillante / Tomaszów	
 1974:	Groszki i róże / Sur le pont d’Avignon / Jaki śmieszny / Cyganka / Zmory wiosenne

List of songs
The list presents the songs sung by Ewa Demarczyk arranged in alphabetical order:

See also
Polish music
sung poetry
Grzegorz Turnau
Anna German
Piwnica pod Baranami
List of Poles

References

External links

Website
The Polish Edith Piaf: A Love Letter to Ewa Demarczyk at Culture.pl
Discography on poezja-spiewana.pl
Profile of Ewa Demarczyk at Culture.pl

Bibliography 
 Angelika Kuźniak, Ewelina Karpacz-Oboładze: Czarny Anioł. Opowieść o Ewie Demarczyk : Znak, Społeczny Instytut Wydawniczy Sp.z o.o. : 2015 : 

1941 births
2020 deaths
Musicians from Kraków
Polish women singers
Recipients of the Order of Polonia Restituta (1944–1989)
Sung poetry of Poland
Cabaret singers
20th-century Polish women